Joseph Parker vs. Andy Ruiz Jr., billed as History, was a professional boxing match between undefeated Joseph Parker and Andy Ruiz Jr. for the vacant WBO heavyweight title. The event took place on 10 December 2016, at the Vector Arena in Auckland, New Zealand. Parker won the contest by majority decision, with two judges scoring it 115–113 and the other 114–114.

History

Background
In late October, the Parker vs. Ruiz Jr. world title fight had been officially sanctioned by the World Boxing Organization. The organisation had granted permission to Parker fighting Ruiz Jr. for their belt with their championship committee voting unanimously in favor of the title fight. The belt was vacated by Tyson Fury, who was battling depression and drug issues and hadn't fought since November when he beat Wladimir Klitschko to snare the WBA (Super), IBF, WBO, IBO, and The Ring magazine titles. Although the WBO president Francisco Varcarcel said his preference was to set up a four-man box-off for the vacant title involving the four top-ranked available contenders for the title, it subsequently went down the route of their own rule book which gave number one ranked Parker the first rights to challenge. With number two ranked Klitschko targeting the WBA belt, it cleared the way for number three Ruiz Jr., to step up against Parker.

Discussions and negotiations began after Fury was expected to be stripped of his WBO title over inactivity and testing positive for cocaine. With his sudden announcement that he would relinquish his heavyweight world titles due to his issues with various problems, it was unclear exactly how the WBA, and WBO would go about filling the vacancies. Before Fury vacated, Duco Events promoter Dean Lonergan announced in early October that he had been negotiating an alternative WBO title fight against Ruiz Jr., suggesting he had a chance of reaching a deal with promoter Bob Arum. He pointed out that the WBO rules state that the two best classified contenders will challenge for the title. Arum told ESPN.com that he was in talks with the WBO about making it for the vacant title. He also said his experience dealing with Parker and his team has so far been a pleasure.

Parker and Ruiz Jr. also had their previous encounters. It had been well-documented that the last time they met was during a sparring session in Las Vegas two years prior, Ruiz was said to have rattled the jaw of Parker so badly that he could not eat properly for three days. Parker said that his trainer Kevin Barry was looking for work for him. Ruiz Jr. had a lot more experience than himself and that he had underestimated Ruiz because of his size during their sparring session.

Controversy
Several issues occurred before the fight was announced. One was the proposed date, with 10 December date preferred by Parker's handlers, Duco Events, and Ruiz preferring the fight to be held in January. The 10 December date was eventually agreed upon.

There was also speculation that the fight would be moved overseas when Auckland Council turned down Duco's bid for public funding. This meant that there was a chance the contest would be held in California, with Ruiz's promoter Arum giving Duco a seven-day deadline to find the supposed shortfall of several hundred thousand dollars. Sponsorship was provided by TAB, Gallagher and Burger King. Martin Snedden said the price of hosting the fight was around $4 million mark, and that this had not been reached despite the sponsor backing.

Fight card

Fight details
Joseph Parker vs. Andy Ruiz Jr. was held at the Vector Arena in Auckland, New Zealand. Tickets for the fight went on sale on 10 November after Duco Events announced that general admission tickets would start from a price of $99. Approximately 8,000 tickets went on sale to the general public. They had elected to go with Ticketmaster for distribution of sales. Meanwhile, Chief Executive Martin Snedden told Fairfax up to 85% of available seating zones, which feature 124 corporate tables seating ten clients along as well as eleven elevated boxes that could accommodate fifteen to twenty people, had already been purchased by corporates for the fight. Although the event was jointly promoted by Duco Events and Top Rank, Duco Events were the lead promoter of the fight.

Tony Weeks served as the referee, and Ramon Cerdan, Salven Lagumbay and Ingo Barrabas were the ringside judges. Four national anthems were sung. The U.S. national anthem, "The Star-Spangled Banner", and Samoa national anthem, "The Banner of Freedom", was performed by Pene Pati of Sol3 Mio. The Mexican national anthem, "Himno Nacional Mexicano", was performed by Marco-Antonio Muniz. The New Zealand national anthem, "God Defend New Zealand", was performed by New Zealand singer Sophie Morris. The announcer of the night was Daniel Hennessey.

Broadcasting
As Parker had exclusive relationships with the broadcaster of Sky at the time of the fight, the telecast of the fight was aired on Sky Arena in New Zealand. The fight was televised through a pay-per-view (PPV) produced by Sky and Duco Events. Sixteen days out from the fight, Duco Events revealed it would cost New Zealand television viewers NZD$59.95 for the sporting event at Auckland's Vector Arena as it featured on Sky Arena. The broadcast of the fight is said to stretch into 100 countries.

In Samoa, a free broadcast of the fight had been made possible through a partnership between Digicel Samoa and Apia Broadcasting Limited, owners of TV3. Digicel Samoa chief executive Rory Condon, TV3 owner Hans Joe Keil and TV3 managing director Verona Parker officially announced the partnership with a sponsorship of the broadcast worth approximately WS$30,000 tālā. BoxNation confirmed via Twitter they would live stream the event on their website and television for their subscribers. ESPN and Fox Sports were the main broadcasters that aired the fight in Brazil, Latin America and many Caribbean countries while BBC Online streamed the fight in all United Kingdom territories.

Prime broadcast a documentary special called Parker v Ruiz Jr: A Fighting Chance, focusing on the two fighters as part of the lead-up to the fight. Sky also aired the programme. It included past Parker fights, coverage of their lives outside of boxing, and special interviews with both their trainers and surrounding media experts, including commentator Bob Sheridan.

The following afternoon of the fight, Sky television announced that they were taking legal action against a large number of people for streaming the event online illegally. It was estimated that the number of streamers reached into the triple digits. The broadcaster and promoter Duco Events have been battling to stop people illegally streaming Parker's fights. The day before, a court ruled against seven individuals found to have unlawfully streamed July's fight between Parker and Solomon Haumono. The judge found each of the seven had infringed Sky's copyright, granted an injunction restraining any further infringements and ordered each defendant to destroy any copies and pay nominal damages of NZD$100 as well as costs of NZD$2,670.

Belt
The winner of the fight received the world championship belt by the WBO. The belt, valued at around $5000, is red with gold-plated motifs and encrusted crystals. It features the names of the two fighters and the bout details. After the belt arrived in New Zealand, it toured Hamilton, Tauranga, Rotorua, Hastings, Palmerston North, Wellington, Nelson, Christchurch, Invercargill, Dunedin, New Plymouth and Whangarei. It was displayed at the premises of fight sponsors Burger King in those cities.

Ruiz handled the belt during a promotion event, saying feeling the prize gave him motivation for the fight. Parker did not touch the belt during the same event.

Recap

Aftermath
After the fight, Ruiz Jr. showed interest in a possible rematch. With many criticism over who was the winner, he had a valid case in regards to believing he dominated large periods of the contest. Although no rematch clause was included in the contract. Parker's camp showed very minimal interest in giving Ruiz another shot when a path towards bigger fights in England could be possible. Ruiz Jr.’s trainer, Abel Sanchez, supported his boxer's call for a rematch.

A lot of criticism surfaced, believing Parker had lost the fight. Parker's promoters were disappointed on what they heard, saying some of the most vocal critics have been bitter towards Parker's success from early in his career. Duco's David Higgins said the criticism was "crap", and that the public deserved to be told the full story. Some, most notably New Zealand Professional Boxing Association president Lance Revill, described the majority decision by the WBO-appointed independent judges as "bullshit", with Revill adding he was embarrassed to be a New Zealander after watching the fight. Rather than score the fight close, Revill had it 118–111 to Ruiz. Most experts ruled it a close Parker win or draw. After his comments, Revill resigned as president of the NZPBA, stating that "I was getting criticised by members of my own association who were saying 'Lance is out of line' and saying I shouldn't be saying that as president. Well, if I can't say it as president, who can say it? I want to be able to say what I like and speak my mind because I don't like the way boxing has been run at the moment."

Scorecard

References

World Boxing Organization heavyweight championship matches
2016 in boxing
December 2016 sports events in New Zealand
2016 in New Zealand sport
Boxing in New Zealand
Sport in Auckland
Boxing matches